The Thunderbird class sailboat was designed in 1958 by Seattle Washington naval architect Ben Seaborn, in response to a request from the Douglas Fir Plywood Association (now APA - The Engineered Wood Association) of Tacoma, Washington for design proposals for a sailboat that would "... be both a racing and cruising boat; provide sleeping accommodations for four crew; be capable of being built by reasonably skilled amateurs; provide auxiliary power by an outboard motor that could be easily removed and stowed; and out-perform other sailboats in its class."

Design and construction
T-Birds can be built of marine plywood, usually fiberglass-covered for minimum maintenance, or with a fiberglass hull and deck. The International Thunderbird Class Association (ITCA) maintains specifications of what dimensions and specifications fit the definition of the Thunderbird class. Many plywood T-Birds have been built by amateur builders, while fiberglass T-Birds usually are built by professional boatbuilders, although plans also are available for "one-off" construction of fiberglass T-Birds by amateur builders.

In North America, professional builders of fiberglass T-Birds are located in Canada (Victoria, British Columbia and Toronto, Ontario). In Australia, where T-Birds also are popular, fiberglass T-Birds are built using hull and deck molds owned by the Australian Thunderbird Class Association. Fiberglass boat parts—such as a complete deck, cabin and cockpit; hatches for the main cabin and forward and aft decks, and a lightweight, foam-filled fiberglass spade rudder—are available from fiberglass boat builders, to modernize or restore older T-Birds.

The  mast, 13.50-foot (4.11 m) boom and 8-foot (2.44 m) spinnaker pole can be built of wood, but most boatbuilders and owners now choose ready-made aluminum spars from a source that meets ITCA specifications, for low maintenance and high performance. Dacron sailcloth is used for the mainsail, genoa and working jib, and nylon for the spinnaker. An alternate dacron/mylar film sailcloth laminate also is approved for the genoa. Only one size of mainsail, genoa, working jib and spinnaker are authorized by ITCA for racing. In keeping with ITCA policy of maintaining the affordability of the T-Bird, only one set of new sails is permitted in a two-year period.

Used T-Birds of plywood or fiberglass construction are often available for sale in many regions where T-Bird fleets have been organized (see below). These boats offer an economical choice for the sailor interested in becoming a T-Bird owner. Prices can range from under $2,000 for older wood boats that may need restoration or repair in various degrees, up to about $20,000 for a completely equipped newer fiberglass boat in championship form. Average prices for boats in good cruising or racing condition in the U.S. and Canada are typically in the range of $5,000 to $13,000, depending on local market conditions. Compared to other sailboats in this size range, such boats can be considered bargains in terms of racing and cruising performance, and cost.

Plan and specifications

Schematic

Mainsail Dimensions:

Performance
The Thunderbird's exceptional performance can be attributed to a lightweight, 3,650 lb (1,656 kg) hull and rig with V-bottom hull and hard chines. Outstanding stability is provided by a 1,530 lb (694 kg) cast iron keel of advanced design with a 4.79-foot (1.46 m) draft. The sail area is 363 square feet (33.72 square meters) in the mainsail and genoa, and racing boats are equipped with a spinnaker. The Thunderbird (or T-Bird, as it is commonly known) has proven to be fast in both light winds and heavy, often out-performing contemporary displacement-type sailboats of similar or even larger size in local handicap races. By way of comparison, where the PHRF handicap for the Thunderbird is 201-204 (seconds per mile), the J/24 rates 185, the San Juan 24 228-237, the Ericson 26 234, the MacGregor 26 259, the Catalina 27 204.

Adaptability
Its 7.54 foot (2.30 m) beam makes it possible to haul the boat by trailer, without special permits, for launching, winter storage and for traveling to long-distance racing or cruising destinations.

Pacific Thunderbird variant
In the early 1960s there was a variant made called the "Pacific Thunderbird" designed by Naval Architect Ben Seaborn, the original designer of the Thunderbird class. It was made in Japan of fiberglass covered plywood. The mast height and sail area were also reduced somewhat, so the boat was more stable. This design was still a fairly fast boat, yet more seaworthy and very comfortable for coastal cruising. There were, however, very few of them sold.

For images of this design, see this site. (Note that this boat was modified to have a bowsprit; the class design does not have this.)

References

External links 
 Thunderbird Class Association
 Thunderbird plans commercial plans of design available

Sailing yachts
1950s sailboat type designs